Ola Möller (born February 21, 1984) is a Swedish designer, author and encyclopedist who created and has maintained the MethodKit Encyclopedia since 2012. MethodKit is a visual encyclopedia and a collection of 33 decks of cards.

He authored Photo Book about Sweden, released in 2009, and was the co-author of This Must Be the Place, an art book released in 2010. Later the books were exhibited in Russia, Georgia and Argentina.

References

External links
 MethodKit Encyclopedia
  Photo Book About Sweden (e-book)
  This Must Be The Place (e-book)
  Georgia Stories (e-book)

Living people
Encyclopedists
Swedish designers
1984 births